The Martinsyde G.100 "Elephant" and the G.102 were British fighter bomber aircraft of the First World War built by Martinsyde. The type gained the name "Elephant" from its relatively large size and lack of manoeuvrability. The G.102 differed from the G.100 only in having a more powerful engine.

Design and development
An unusually large aircraft by contemporary standards for a single-seater, the Elephant two-bay equal span staggered biplane was designed by A A Fletcher of the Martinsyde Company, a prototype powered by a 120 hp Austro-Daimler engine entering test in the autumn of 1915.

The initial production version, the G.100, was powered by a 120h p six-cylinder Beardmore engine and was armed with a single 0.303 in drum-fed Lewis Gun mounted above the centre section. This was later augmented by a similar weapon bracket-mounted to the port fuselage side behind the cockpit).

The G.100 was gradually succeeded by the G.102 with a 160 hp Beardmore engine.

Operational use
The G.100 was built originally as a long-range, single-seat fighter and escort machine but on the basis of its size and weight was reclassified as a day bomber.

Deliveries to the RFC commenced in mid-1916, a total of 270 being manufactured. The G.100 and G.102 Elephants were used in France and the Middle East, although only No. 27 Squadron, RFC was completely equipped with this type.

While not particularly successful as a fighter owing to its poor agility by comparison other fighters of the times, the Elephant performed a useful service in long-range bombing, carrying up to a 260 lb (120 kg) bomb load. It successfully performed this role from the summer of 1916 through to late 1917. It was also used for long-range photo reconnaissance, where stability and endurance were required (the type was capable of a five-and-a-half-hour flight).

Variants
 Martinsyde G.100 : Single-seat fighter-scout, bomber and reconnaissance biplane, powered by a 120 hp (89 kW) Beardmore piston engine. 100 built.
 Martinsyde G.102 : Single-seat fighter-scout, bomber and reconnaissance biplane, powered by a 160 hp (119 kW) Beardmore piston engine. 171 built.

Operators

Australian Flying Corps
 No. 1 Squadron AFC in Egypt and Palestine. 

Royal Flying Corps
 No. 14 Squadron RFC
 No. 18 Squadron RFC
 No. 20 Squadron RFC
 No. 21 Squadron RFC
 No. 23 Squadron RFC
 No. 25 Squadron RFC
 No. 27 Squadron RFC
 No. 30 Squadron RFC
 No. 31 Squadron RFC
 No. 39 Squadron RFC
 No. 51 Squadron RFC
 No. 63 Squadron RFC
 No. 72 Squadron RFC
 No. 110 Squadron RFC
 No. 142 Squadron RFC

Specifications (G.100)

See also

References

 Kenneth Munson Aircraft of World War I, 1967 Ian Allan 

1910s British fighter aircraft
1910s British bomber aircraft
G.100
Aircraft first flown in 1915